Die Dresdner Philharmoniker is an East German documentary film. It follows the Dresden Philharmonic and its artistic manager Heinz Bongartz on a tour to Czechoslovakia, France, Hungary and Romania. It was directed by Joachim Kunert and released in 1955.

External links
 

1955 films
East German films
1950s German-language films
Documentary films about classical music and musicians
German documentary films
German black-and-white films
1955 documentary films
1950s German films